Funmilola Ogundana (26 December 1980 – 8 February 2013) was a Nigerian sprinter who specialized in the 100 metres.
She died during childbirth in Abuja, Nigeria.

Achievements

Personal bests
100 metres - 11.58 s (2005)
200 metres - 23.56 s (1998) 
100 metres hurdles - 14.17 s (2007)

External links

1980 births
2013 deaths
Nigerian female sprinters
Athletes (track and field) at the 2006 Commonwealth Games
Commonwealth Games competitors for Nigeria
Yoruba sportswomen
Deaths in childbirth
20th-century Nigerian women
21st-century Nigerian women